Ennis Haywood (December 5, 1979 – May 11, 2003) was a National Football League running back for the Dallas Cowboys.

Football career
Ennis Haywood was a Dallas Carter High School standout for two years. He played college football at Iowa State University. As a junior and again as a senior, Ennis led the Big 12 in rushing in 2000 and 2001, leading the Cyclones to back to back bowl appearances. He ranks fifth on Iowa State's all-time rushing yards list with 2,862 yards and sixth with 27 rushing touchdowns.

He was on the Cowboys practice squad in 2002 before competing for a roster spot in 2003.

Death
Haywood was rushed to the hospital on May 10, 2003, after he began vomiting in his sleep and ceased breathing. He was later taken off life support at his family's request. It was later found that a mixture of prescription medications (for Haywood's asthma) and alcohol played a part in his death.

Personal life
Haywood was married with two children.

References

External links

1979 births
2003 deaths
American football running backs
Iowa State Cyclones football players
Dallas Cowboys players
Drug-related deaths in Texas
Alcohol-related deaths in Texas
Players of American football from Dallas